The 1978 Cal State Northridge  Matadors football team represented California State University, Northridge as a member of the California Collegiate Athletic Association (CCAA) during the 1978 NCAA Division II football season. Led by Jack Elway in his third and final season as head coach, Cal State Northridge compiled an overall record of 5–5 with a mark of 0–2 in conference play, placing last out of three teams in the CCAA. The team outscored its opponents 252 to 214 for the season. The Matadors played home games at North Campus Stadium in Northridge, California.

Schedule

References

Cal State Northridge
Cal State Northridge Matadors football seasons
Cal State Northridge Matadors football